The World Championship of Online Poker (WCOOP) is an online poker tournament series sponsored by PokerStars. It is played on the PokerStars website in September.

Established in 2002, WCOOP is PokerStars' attempt to establish the online equivalent of the World Series of Poker.  The WCOOP tournament series is the largest of its kind on the Internet.

The fifteen WCOOP events in 2005 generated $12,783,900 in prize money, making it not only the biggest ever online poker event, but the third biggest poker series (live or online) in all of 2005.

Keeping with the tradition of the World Series of Poker, the WCOOP is a series of tournaments in which players compete in a variety of different poker games, each with different buy-in and prize levels.  The games featured are Limit, Pot Limit and No Limit Texas Hold'em, Seven Card Stud and Seven Card Stud Hi/Lo, Razz, Pot Limit Omaha High and Limit Omaha Hi/Lo, and H.O.R.S.E. In 2007, 5 Card Draw and 2-7 Triple draw were added. 2-7 Single Draw and mixed limit games were added in 2008, and Badugi was added in 2009. The main event is No Limit Hold'em.

In addition to the cash prize, the winner of each WCOOP event received a personally engraved 14 karat gold bracelet from PokerStars up until 2015. Since then, PokerStars has discontinued awarding bracelets to save costs.

2002 Events

The 2002 World Championship of Online Poker consisted of nine events with over $730,000 in combined prizes. The events, buy-ins, and winners are listed below.

2003 Events

The 2003 World Championship of Online Poker consisted of 11 events with a total prize pool of over $2.7 million. The events, buy-ins, and winners are listed below.

2004 Events

The 2004 World Championship of Online Poker consisted of 12 events with a total prize pool of over $6 Million. The events, buy-ins, and winners are listed below.

2005 Events

The 2005 World Championship of Online Poker consisted of 15 events with a total prize pool of over $12 Million. The events, buy-ins, and winners are listed below.

2006 Events

The 2006 World Championship of Online Poker consisted of 18 events. The schedule including buy in for each event is listed below. 2006 WCOOP Total Prize Pool was $18,674,300

1spawng becomes first player to win 2 WCOOP Bracelets.
²kwob20 becomes first player to win 2 WCOOP bracelets in one year
³The original first prize was to be $1,157,737.50, but the final six players in the tournament struck a deal to more evenly divide the prize money.

2007 Events
The 2007 World Championship of Online Poker consists of 23 events. The schedule including buy in for each event is listed below. 2007 WCOOP Total Prize Pool was $24,218,600 

The event was marred by controversy when the original winner of the main event, TheV0id was disqualified for using multiple accounts in the tournament following an investigation by PokerStars.  

1Original winner, Mark 'TheV0id' Teltscher, disqualified.

2008 Events
There were 33 events played in the September 2008 WCOOP. Each day of the 2008 WCOOP featured two events.

1This event uses the same blind structure on the previous event (No Limit Hold'em)
2 the player known as "liberace" who was the runner-up of the $5,200 No-Limit Hold'em Main Event, won more than the winner due to an earlier chop while five handed of $1,375,249

2009 Events
There were 45 events in the 2009 WCOOP, including Badugi, big antes No Limit Hold'em, and some new formats. A total of 43,973 unique players in 140 countries participated, making a total prize pool of $51,652,800.

1Holds the record for the largest WCOOP field ever.
2This event uses the 9x awards structure.

2010 Events
There were 62 events in the 2010 WCOOP.

* next to the first place prize denotes a deal was made at the final table, original first place prizes are hidden and can be seen in edit mode
** This event was originally scheduled on one day before the date listed above and listed at event 39, but the order was changed so that events 40 and 41 were run before this one.
1g0lfa (Ryan D'Angelo) becomes first player to win 3 WCOOP Bracelets.
2Largest amount of money won in online poker history, 2010 Main Event (Tyson "POTTERPOKER" Marks)

2011 Events
There were 62 events in the 2011 WCOOP.
This was the first WCOOP series since Black Friday 2011, A legal action by the U.S. Government that forbids people living in the United States from playing poker for real money on the site due to banking regulations, as a result there are many current or former US citizens playing online from other countries the following list reflects as always the nations where the winners were logged-in at the time of the event.

2012 Events
There were 65 events in the 2012 WCOOP.
The following list reflects, as always, the nations where the winners were logged-in at the time of the event.

2013 Events
There were 66 events in the 2013 WCOOP.

2014 Events
There were 66 events in the 2014 WCOOP.

2015 Events
There were 70 events in the 2015 WCOOP.

2016 Events
There were 82 events in the 2016 WCOOP.

2017 Events
There were 82 "High" events in the 2017 WCOOP, and PokerStars also introduced a "Low" buy-in WCOOP series, with the same events, to run concurrently.

HIGH

LOW

† includes bounties

2018 Events
There were 186 events in the 2018 WCOOP.

2019 Events

There were 219 tournaments during WCOOP 2019 including a tie-in with UFC, which awarded winners tickets to a UFC bout in New York.

†including bounties
denotes deal

2020 Events

WCOOP Main Event Winners

WCOOP Player of the Series

WCOOP Multiple Event Winners

Up to Season 17 (2018)

WCOOP Bracelet Winners by Country

Below is a breakdown of the login countries of all bracelet winners in the history of the WCOOP:

  USA - 103
  Canada - 80
  Russia - 60
  United Kingdom - 50
  Mexico - 35
  Sweden - 31
  Norway - 24
  Germany - 24
  Netherlands - 23
  Finland - 17
  Australia - 17
  Poland - 15
  Denmark - 14
  Austria - 12
  Brazil - 12
  Hungary - 11
  Belgium - 8
  Ukraine - 7
  France - 7
  Argentina - 7
  Bulgaria - 6
  Romania - 6
  Costa Rica - 5
  Ireland - 5
  Czech Republic - 5
  Greece - 4
  Cyprus - 4
  Malta - 3
  Taiwan - 3
  South Africa - 3
  Philippines - 1
  Slovenia - 1
  Kazakhstan - 1
  Bosnia and Herzegovina - 1
  Uruguay - 1
  Chile - 1
  Croatia - 1
  Armenia - 1

WCOOP Challenge Series

Challenge Series 1 (2013)

Challenge Series 2 (2014)

Challenge Series 3 (2014)

WCOOP Challenge Winners by Country

  Austria - 2
  Brazil - 2
  Canada - 2
  Finland - 2
  Israel - 2
  Mexico - 2
  United Kingdom - 2
  Australia - 1
  Czech Republic - 1
  Denmark - 1
  Estonia - 1
  Germany - 1
  Netherlands - 1
  Norway - 1
  Peru - 1
  Poland - 1
  Romania - 1
  Singapore - 1
  Sweden - 1

See also
World Cup of Poker
Full Tilt Online Poker Series
PlayWCOOP

References

External links
Official site
Pokerstars.com WCOOP site
Pokerstars.tv live WCOOP broadcasts
CBS News Story about a group of friends who played on one account together in the WCOOP and made decisions jointly.

PokerStars
Poker tournaments
Online gambling
Recurring sporting events established in 2002
Poker, Online
Poker